Otherwise than Being, or Beyond Essence is a 1974 work of philosophy by Emmanuel Levinas, the second of his mature works after Totality and Infinity.

References

1974 non-fiction books
Ethics books
Phenomenology literature
Contemporary philosophical literature
Books by Emmanuel Levinas